The 2016–17 Serbian Cup season was the eleventh season of the Serbian national football tournament.

The competition started in September 2016, and ended in May 2017.

The winner of the competition qualified for the 2017–18 UEFA Europa League.

Calendar

Preliminary round
A preliminary round was held in order to reduce the number of teams competing in the first round to 32. It consisted of 3 single-legged ties, with a penalty shoot-out as the decider if the score was tied after 90 minutes. This round featured the bottom 5 teams from the 2015–16 Serbian First League, as well as 5 regional cup winners. The draw was held on 3 September 2016, and it contained seeded and unseeded teams. The bottom 5 teams from the 2015–16 Serbian First League (Dinamo Vranje, Sloboda Užice, Donji Srem, Loznica and Radnički 1923) were set as unseeded teams, with the 5 regional cup winners (Žarkovo, Radan Lebane, Polet Ljubić, Mladost Bački Jarak and Trepča) being set as seeded teams. The draw was conducted with the idea of minimizing expenses for the participating clubs. The matches were played on 7 September 2016. Donji Srem was dissolved after the end of 2015–16 season, so Mladost Bački Jarak, which was drawn against Donji Srem, received an automatic bye to the first round. Furthermore, Sloga PM, which earned a place in the first round via last season's final position in the First League, was also dissolved. Thus, both teams from the proposed tie Radan Lebane - Dinamo Vranje received an automatic bye to the first round. In total, around 1050 spectators attended the games (avg. 350 per game).

Round of 32
In this round, six teams that advanced from the previous round were joined by all 16 teams from the 2015–16 Serbian SuperLiga, as well as the top 11 teams from the 2015–16 Serbian First League, with the exception of the dissolved Sloga PM. The draw was held on 12 September 2016, and it contained seeded(16 teams from 2015–16 Serbian SuperLiga) and unseeded teams. Drawing of the lots was conducted by former national team player and head coach Vladimir Petrović. Teams that played below Serbian First League in the previous season (Žarkovo, Radan Lebane, Polet Ljubić and Mladost Bački Jarak) were automatically named as hosts. The matches were played on 20 and 21 September 2016. No extra time was played if the score was tied after the regular 90 minutes. Those games went straight to penalties. In total, around 16800 spectators attended the games (avg. 1050 per game).

Round of 16
The 16 winners from first round took part in this stage of the competition. The draw was held on 14 October 2016, and it contained seeded and unseeded teams. Drawing of the lots was conducted by the former national team player Mitar Mrkela. The seeds were determined by last season's final standings in the Serbian top divisions. Seeded teams: Red Star Belgrade, Partizan, Čukarički, Vojvodina, Borac Čačak, Voždovac, Radnik Surdulica and Mladost Lučani. Unseeded teams: Spartak Subotica, Rad, Javor Ivanjica, Novi Pazar, Jagodina (II), BSK Borča (II), Sloboda Užice (II) and Žarkovo (III). Žarkovo, having played in the league level below the Serbian First League in the previous season, was automatically named as host. The matches were played on 25 and 26 October 2016. No extra time was played if the score was tied after the regular 90 minutes. Those games went straight to penalties. In total, around 8700 spectators attended the games (avg. 1087 per game).

Quarter-finals
The 8 winners from the second round took part in this stage of the competition. The draw was held on 23 November 2016 and it contained seeded and unseeded teams. Drawing of the lots was conducted by the current head coach of U21 national team, Tomislav Sivić. The seeds were determined by the following key: Last season's cup semifinalists were automatically set as seeded teams, while the remaining seeds were determined by last season's final standings in top Serbian divisions. Seeded teams: Partizan, Borac Čačak, Red Star Belgrade and Čukarički. Unseeded teams: Vojvodina, Voždovac, Mladost Lučani and Sloboda Užice (II). The matches were played on 5 April 2017. In total, around 5200 spectators attended the games (avg. 1300 per game).

Semi-finals
The 4 winners from the Quarter finals (Partizan, Red Star Belgrade, Čukarički and Vojvodina) took part in the semi-finals. The draw was held on 11 April 2017, and there were no seedings in the draw. The drawing of the lots was conducted by the former national team player Goran Bunjevčević. Semi-finals were contested over two legs. First legs were played on 26 April 2017, and second legs were played on 9 and 10 May 2017. In total, around 35400 spectators attended the games (avg. 8850 per game).

|}

First legs

Second legs

Final

Winners from the Semi-finals took part in the single-legged final. The match was played on 27 May 2017. Host of the game, and the venue of the finals were decided by drawing of the lots. The draw was conducted, once again, by the former national team player Goran Bunjevčević.

References

External links
 Official site

Serbian Cup seasons
Cup
Serbian Cup